British girl group Little Mix have released six studio albums, one compilation album, 33 singles (including one charity single) and 40 music videos. As of 2021, the group have amassed 44 chart entries on the UK Singles Chart, with five number ones and 19 top-ten singles. According to the Official Charts Company, Little Mix have sold over 28 million singles and 3.6 million albums in the UK. They have collated over 12 billion streams across all streaming platforms, and have sold over 50 million records worldwide, making them one of the world's best-selling girl groups. In 2021, they became the first girl group to spend a total of 100 weeks within the top 10 of the UK Singles Chart.

Little Mix released their X Factor winner's single, a cover of Damien Rice's "Cannonball", as their debut single in December 2011. The single became the group's first number-one single when it topped the UK Singles Chart. The lead single from their debut album "Wings" became their second number-one single in the UK. It also reached number three in Australia and number seven in Japan. In November 2012, Little Mix released their debut album DNA. The album peaked inside the top 10 in ten countries, including the UK where it debuted number three. The album has been certified platinum in the UK where it had sold 473,000 copies there as of May 2022. In May 2013, the group released their debut album in the United States, where it debuted at number four, becoming the highest debut from a British girl group in the US, beating a record previously held by the Spice Girls, who debuted at number six with their debut album Spice in 1996. DNA spawned three more singles; the UK top three hit and title track "DNA"  and the UK top 20 singles "Change Your Life" and "How Ya Doin'?".

Their second album, Salute, was released in November 2013 and became their second album to debut inside the top 10 in both the UK, Australia and the US. The album's lead single  "Move" reached number three in the UK. Salute has been certified platinum in the UK, and had sold 429,000 copies there as of May 2022. The album produced two more singles; "Little Me" and the top 10 hit and title track "Salute".  The group released a cover version of the Cameo song "Word Up!" as the official single for Sport Relief 2014 which reached the top 10 in the UK. In May 2015, Little Mix released "Black Magic" as the lead single from their third album. The song debuted at number one in the UK and remained at the top of the chart for three weeks, becoming the first single by a girl group to do so since Sugababes's "About You Now" in October 2007. The song also reached number eight in Australia becoming their third top 10 hit there. The group's third album Get Weird was released in November 2015 and debuted at number two in both the UK and Australia while reaching number one in Ireland. In the US the album peaked at number 13, making Little Mix the only girl group from the UK to have their first three albums debut in the top fifteen of the Billboard 200. Get Weird has been certified double platinum in the UK and has sold 950,000 copies there as of November 2021. The album's second and fourth single "Love Me Like You" and "Hair" both peaked at number 11 in the UK, while the third single "Secret Love Song" reached number six in the UK. "Hair" became the group's fourth top 10 single in Australia.

In October 2016 Little Mix released the lead single "Shout Out to My Ex" from their fourth studio album Glory Days. The song debuted at number one on the UK Singles Chart becoming their fourth chart topping single there. It sold 95,000 copies in combined sales in its debut week with 67,000 being downloads, making it the biggest opening week download sales for a song in 2016. Glory Days was released on 18 November 2016 and debuted at number one on the UK album chart, becoming the groups first UK number one album. Glory Days sold 96,000 copies in combined sales in the first week which was the highest first week sales for a UK girl group number-one album since the Spice Girls in 1997 and spent five weeks at number one, making the album the longest-reigning number-one by a girl group since the Spice Girls. The album's second single, "Touch", was released in December 2016 and peaked at number four on the UK Singles Chart, later being certified double platinum in the UK for 1,200,000 equivalent-units moved in the country. In March 2017, "No More Sad Songs" featuring Machine Gun Kelly was released as the album's third official single. It peaked at number fifteen on the UK Singles Chart and has been certified platinum in the UK for moving 600,000 units in the country. The group released the fourth single, "Power" featuring Stormzy, on 26 May 2017, which has peaked at number six on the UK Singles Chart, making it their third top ten single from Glory Days, and has been certified platinum in the country. The band's fifth album, LM5, was released on 16 November 2018. Preceded by lead single "Woman Like Me", featuring Nicki Minaj, it became their fifth UK top-five album.

Albums

Studio albums

Reissues

Compilation albums

Extended plays

Singles

As lead artist

As featured artist

Promotional singles

Other charted songs

Other appearances

Music videos

See also
 List of songs recorded by Little Mix

Notes

References

External links
 

Discography
Discographies of British artists
Pop music group discographies